The 1970–71 Texas Chaparrals season was the fourth season of the Chaparrals in the American Basketball Association. In order to try to attract more fans, the Chaparrals adopted the Texas moniker, even playing games in Fort Worth, Texas, at the Tarrant County Coliseum along with Lubbock, Texas, at the Lubbock Municipal Coliseum. This practice was scrapped after the season, along with the moniker, as the team was renamed before the next season. For the fourth straight year, the Chaps made the playoffs, but for the third straight year in a row they bowed out in the Division Semifinals, once again to Utah.

Roster

Transactions

Trades

Final standings

Western Division

Playoffs
The Rockets and Chaparrals were tied for the fourth and final playoff spot in the Western Division, so the two teams played in a one game playoff, with the Chaps winning 115–109.

Western Division Semifinals

Awards and honors
1971 ABA All-Star Game selections (game played on January 23, 1971)
Donnie Freeman

References

 Chaparrals on Basketball Reference

External links
 RememberTheABA.com 1970-71 regular season and playoff results
 RememberTheABA.com Dallas Chaparrals page

Dallas Chaparrals
Texas
Texas Chaparrals, 1970-71
Texas Chaparrals, 1970-71